A rich variety of musical instruments are known from Georgia. Among the most popular instruments are blown instruments, like the soinari, known in Samegrelo as larchemi (Georgian panpipe), stviri (flute), gudastviri (bagpipe), string instruments like changi (harp), chonguri (four stringed unfretted long neck lute), panduri (three stringed fretted long neck lute), bowed chuniri, known also as chianuri, and a variety of drums. Georgian musical instruments are traditionally overshadowed by the rich vocal traditions of Georgia, and subsequently received much less attention from Georgian (and Western) scholars. Dimitri Arakishvili and particularly Manana Shilakadze contributed to the study of musical instrument in Georgia.

List of instruments 
Wind instruments: larchemi/soinari, salamuri, pilili, gudastviri, duduki, zurna and stviri

Brass wind instruments: sankeri

String instruments: panduri, chonguri, chuniri, chianuri and changi

Percussion instruments: doli, daira, tsintsila and diplipito

Georgian accordion

References